Rumination may refer to:
 Rumination, the digestive process of ruminants
 Rumination syndrome, a chronic condition characterized by effortless regurgitation of most meals following consumption
 Deep thought or consideration
 Rumination (psychology), contemplation or reflection, which may become persistent and recurrent worrying or brooding
 Ruminations, an email column and series of books written by comedian Aaron Karo
 Ruminations (album), a 2016 album by American musician Conor Oberst

ia:Rumination